Sex & Mrs. X is a 2000 Lifetime television film. It was directed by Arthur Allan Seidelman and based on an article published by Amanda Vaill in Allure. It stars Jacqueline Bisset and Linda Hamilton and premiered on 10 April 2000.

Plot
Joanna (Hamilton) is a magazine writer whose life is thrown into disarray when her husband leaves her for another woman. But she finds salvation when she is assigned to interview a Paris madame (Bisset) who inspires a sexual reawakening in her.

Cast
 Jacqueline Bisset as Madame Simone
 Linda Hamilton as Joanna Scott
 Paolo Seganti as Francesco
 Peter MacNeill as Harry Frost
 Sarah Lafleur as Maid
Stewart Bick as Dale Scott
 Tracey E. Bregman as Katherine
Marina Anderson as Shirley
 Jonathan Potts as Rick Stockwell

Announced Remake 
Deadline announced that Lionsgate, which owns the IP to this film via their ownership of the Hearst Entertainment library, was working with MarVista Entertainment in re-imagining this film and over 100 others in the Hearst library. Some other confirmed films include The Babysitter's Seduction, Sex, Lies & Obsession, Blue Valley Songbird, A Different Kind of Christmas, and Santa Who?. Both companies, which are jointly distributing these films, told the publication that they are targeting a streaming-savvy audience with these films and plan to release them to a streaming service, which hasn't been determined yet.

References

External links
 

2000 television films
2000 films
Films shot in Los Angeles
Films shot in Toronto
Lifetime (TV network) films